Neopeckia is a genus of fungi in the class Dothideomycetes. The relationship of this taxon to other taxa within the class is unknown (incertae sedis).

The genus name of Neopeckia is in honour of Charles Horton Peck (1833–1917), who was an American mycologist. He has described over 2,700 species of North American fungi. 

The genus was circumscribed by Pier Andrea Saccardo in Bull. Torrey Bot. Club vol.10 on page 127 in 1883.

Species
Neopeckia anceps
Neopeckia argentinensis
Neopeckia asperulispora
Neopeckia bambusae
Neopeckia brasiliana
Neopeckia carpini
Neopeckia constricta
Neopeckia coulteri
Neopeckia episphaeria
Neopeckia fulcita
Neopeckia herpotrichioides
Neopeckia japonica
Neopeckia nitidula
Neopeckia nobilis
Neopeckia oryzopsis
Neopeckia palustris
Neopeckia parietalis
Neopeckia pumila
Neopeckia quercina
Neopeckia rhodostoma
Neopeckia roberti

Transferred species;
 Neopeckia caesalpiniae now Herpotrichia caesalpiniae in Melanommataceae family
 Neopeckia diffusa now Herpotrichia diffusa (Melanommataceae)
 Neopeckia hainanensis now Byssosphaeria hainanensis (Melanommataceae)
 Neopeckia rhodosticta now Herpotrichia rhodosticta (Melanommataceae) 
 Neopeckia thaxteri now Spinulosphaeria thaxteri in Sordariomycetidae family.

See also
List of Dothideomycetes genera incertae sedis

References

Dothideomycetes enigmatic taxa
Dothideomycetes genera
Taxa named by Pier Andrea Saccardo